Alexander Mocsary, sometimes  (27 September 1841, Nagyvárad - 26 December 1915, Budapest) was a Hungarian entomologist who specialised in Hymenoptera.

He was the Curator of the Hungarian Natural History Museum where his collection of mainly Hungarian insects of all Orders is conserved. He described many new taxa.

Works
 Ordo. Hymenoptera. In: Paszlavsky, J.: Fauna Regni Hungariae. Regia Societas Scientiarum Naturalium Hungarica, Budapest: 7–113 (1918)

References
 Anonym, 1911 [Mocsary, A.] Rovart. Lapok 18 27
 Kutzscher, C. & Taeger, A., 1998 Portraits und biographische Daten. In: Taeger, A. & Blank, S. M. 1998 (Hrsg.) Pflanzenwespen Deutschlands (Hymenoptera, Symphyta). Kommentierte Bestandsaufnahme. Goecke & Evers, Keltern
 Musgrave, A., 1932 Bibliography of Australian Entomology 1775 - 1930. - Sydney 227-229
 Soldanski, H., 1916 Aus der entomologischen Welt. Dt. ent. Z. 1916(1) 87-89 87
 Viereck, H. L., 1922 [Mocsary, A.] Ent. News 33 157-158

1841 births
1915 deaths
19th-century Hungarian zoologists
Hungarian entomologists
Hymenopterists
Neuroptera
People from Oradea
20th-century Hungarian zoologists